A.C.E (acronym for "Adventure Calling Emotions".) is a South Korean boy band formed by Beat Interactive, and co-managed with Swing Entertainment. The group consists of five members: Jun, Donghun, Wow, Kim Byeongkwan, and Chan. The group debuted on May 23, 2017, with the single "Cactus".

A.C.E first gained a following busking on the streets of the hip Hongdae district in Seoul, covering the dance choreography of popular groups such as BTS, Blackpink and EXO.

As of September 2021, the group have released 2 repackaged albums, 4 mini-albums, and 2 single albums.

History

Pre-debut
Jun trained under Jellyfish Entertainment alongside VIXX before transferring to CJ E&M. He appeared on Mnet's I Can See Your Voice as Kangta's look-alike. Donghun competed on Superstar K5 prior to becoming a trainee under CJ E&M, and later appeared on I Can See Your Voice as well, winning the episode and earning high praise from Got7's JB. Wow trained at YG Entertainment alongside Winner before later moving to CJ E&M, where he met Jun and Donghun. Kim Byeongkwan participated in Season 1 of K-pop Star but was eliminated during the final round of casting. He also trained under JYP Entertainment alongside Chan.

2017–2018: Cactus, Callin, and A.C.E Adventures in Wonderland

On May 23, 2017, A.C.E released their debut single album Cactus, a Hardstyle song produced by Zoobeater Sound. A.C.E released their second single album Callin' on October 19, 2017. On March 15, 2018, the group released a special single titled "5TAR (Incompletion)", with the song serving as a gift to fans after their brief hiatus to join The Unit and Mix Nine.

Group members Kim Byeongkwan and Donghun won 4th and 8th place respectively on survival show Mix Nine in January 2018. They would have debuted in a temporary boy group, but the debut was cancelled later that year.

On June 7, 2018, A.C.E released their repackaged album, A.C.E Adventures in Wonderland, with their title track "Take Me Higher". Group member Chan did not take part in this album due to his promotions with temporary boy group UNB, after winning 9th place on survival show The Unit earlier that year.

A.C.E featured on their first collaboration with French DJ Hcue for the track, "I Feel So Lucky" that was released on September 14, 2018, aiming for a Moombahton sound fused with K-pop elements.

2019–2020: Under Cover, Under Cover : The Mad Squad, and HJZM : The Butterfly Phantasy
On May 17, 2019, A.C.E released their second extended play Under Cover with the title track of the same name.

A.C.E released their third extended play, Under Cover: The Mad Squad on October 29, 2019, with the title track "Savage".

A.C.E released their fourth extended play, HJZM: The Butterfly Phantasy on September 2, 2020, with the title track "Favorite Boys". On December 18, 2020, A.C.E signed with Asian Agent for global management.

A.C.E released a remix of the song Favorite Boys by American DJ Steve Aoki, featuring the Nigerian-American rapper Thutmose, retitled "Fav Boyz" on January 8, 2021.

2021–present: New agency, Siren : Dawn, Changer : Dear Eris and military enlistments 
On February 5, 2021, it was announced that Swing Entertainment will co-manage A.C.E alongside Beat Interactive. Swing Entertainment will be in charge of artist's domestic broadcasting appearances, while Beat Interactive is in charge of production, global marketing, artist care management and fan marketing.

On April 16, 2021, A.C.E released the collaboration single "Down", featuring Grey.

A.C.E released their fifth extended play Siren: Dawn on June 23, 2021, with the title track "Higher". A.C.E’s latest release ‘SIREN: DAWN’ showed their growing popularity. It charted at Number 1 in several countries across the world. The album peaked at Number 1 on the iTunes Worldwide Albums Chart two days after it was released. The countries where it reached Number 1 include (but are not limited to): Brazil, Belarus, Ecuador, Peru, Norway, Indonesia, Russia, Singapore, Portugal and Malaysia. It also peaked at number 6 in the US iTunes chart and number 13 in the UK, two of the worlds biggest music markets. Within just 6 hours of release the album also peaked at number one on the K-Pop Albums Chart. Lead single ‘Higher’ was reached number 3 on the K-Pop Music Song chart. The EP earned many strong reviews with NME praising the members, stating: “Keep an eye on this headstrong quintet, because there’s no question they’ll surprise us in the years to come.”

A.C.E have shown support for the LGBTQ+ community, with the latest showing of support being the release of their song 'Spark' which is part of the original soundtrack for boys' love Korean drama Light on Me. "Spark" was released on July 8, 2021. Jun said of the release: "Just like how all of our fans, CHOICE, are different in their own special ways, we know that there [are] a range of different ways to love among all kinds of people in this world which we acknowledge and respect."

A.C.E released their second repackaged album Changer: Dear Eris on September 2, 2021, with the title track "Changer".

Military service enlistments:
On August 20, 2021, it was announced that Wow would be enlisting for his mandatory military service on September 10, where he is serving as a public service worker.
On September 23, 2001, Donghun enlisted as a public service worker.
On February 7, 2022, Jun enlisted for his military service as an active duty soldier.
On April 11, 2022, Kim Byeongkwan enlisted as a member of KATUSA.
On August 16, 2022, Chan enlisted for his military service as an active duty soldier.

Members
List of members names/stage names and positions:

 Donghun (동훈) – Main vocalist
 Wow (와우) – Main dancer, main rapper, vocalist
 Jun (준) – Leader, lead vocalist, lead dancer
 Kim Byeongkwan (김병관, formerly known as Jason) – Main performer, main rapper, vocalist
 Chan (찬) – Main vocalist

Discography

Reissues

Extended plays

Single albums

Singles

Collaborations

Soundtrack appearances

Filmography

Dramas

Television shows

Awards and nominations

Notes

References

External links

 

South Korean musical groups
2017 establishments in South Korea
Musical groups established in 2017
South Korean boy bands
Swing Entertainment artists
Musical quintets
K-pop music groups